Ron Berlinski (born 8 August 1994) is a German professional footballer who plays as a forward for  club Rot-Weiss Essen.

Career
Berlinski joined 3. Liga club SC Verl from fifth-tier side RSV Meinerzhagen in summer 2021. On 24 August 2021, he made his starting debut for SC Verl in the league, scoring a brace in a 4–4 draw against Hallescher FC.

References

External links
 

1994 births
Living people
German footballers
Association football forwards
3. Liga players
SC Verl players
Rot-Weiss Essen players